Game, Game, Game, and again Game is a digital poem and game by Jason Nelson, published on the web in 2007. The poem is simultaneously played and read as it takes the form of a quirky, hand-drawn online platform game. It was translated into French by Amélie Paquet for Revue Blueorange in 2010. Its sequel is I made this. You play this. We are Enemies (2009).

Gameplay and reading experience 
Although the game uses game mechanics familiar from simple platform games, the hand-drawn graphics and the integration of poetic lines and phrases draw attention to the literary and aesthetic features of the experience. Rather than striving for a high score, the player is "moving, jumping, and falling through an excessive, disjointed, poetic atmosphere".

Game, Game, Game, and again Game has "high interpretive difficulty from a minimal mechanical difficulty", Patrick Jagoda argues. It is not difficult to play the game, he writes: "the game includes relatively few enemies and obstacles, avoids substantial punitive measures for the avatar’s death, and gives the player an unlimited number of lives". However, it is difficult to interpret the meaning of the game while playing it. For instance, the level names are often long and subtitled, but disappear quickly, cheating the reader-player of the "slow reflectiveness that is both possible and encouraged in print-based poetry".

In their introduction to the work for its inclusion in the Electronic Literature Collection Vol. 2, the editors describe set thus: "By usurping the well-known conventions of video game play, in this case, the run-and-leap paradigm familiar since Donkey Kong, Nelson has found a way to lure the user through his many levels of writing, drawings and old home movies with a simple but effective reward, increased survival."

The gameplay has been documented in video recordings by archivists and Let's Play videos.

Reception 
The game is available on many indie gaming platforms, and has been taught at universities. Nelson himself describes his surprise at the online attention the game received when reviewed on game sites: "Here was an artwork, considered experimental in the fields of electronic art and writing (a digital poem and art-game for crusty crunk’s sake), and it was being discussed, shared, blasted and praised as a game". L.B. Jeffries writes that it will "forever change how you think about video games."

David Thomas Henry Wright notes that "disrupts commercial video game design". However, Maria Engberg and Jay David Bolter argue that the game "nevertheless strikes the player/reader as playful, rather than menacing or laden with corporate critique". Astrid Ensslin describes it as "primarily playable rather than readable".

References

External links 

 French translation

2007 video games
2008 in Internet culture
Electronic literature works
Art games
New media art
Poems